Plunge may refer to:
Plunge (American football), a play in American football
Plunge (geology), the inclination of a surface or axis of an anticline to the horizontal
The Plunge, a historic swim center in Richmond, California
Plunge Creek, a river in Alaska
Plungė, a city in Lithuania
Plunge, the former name for the American rock band Cinder Road
Plunge, a type of waterfall
Plunge (gambling), sudden support for a horse in a race
 A swim center in Belmont Park (San Diego), California
Plunge for distance, a former diving event
Plunge (album), a 2017 album by Fever Ray

See also
 Plunger, a common device used to release stoppages in plumbing
 Plunger (disambiguation)